The list of ship launches in 1929 includes a chronological list of notable ships launched in 1929.


References

Sources

1929
Ship launches